The 1994 World Karate Championships are the 12th edition of the World Karate Championships, and were held in Kota Kinabalu, Malaysia from December 8 to December 11, 1994.

Medalists

Men

Women

Medal table

References

 Results
 Results

External links
 World Karate Federation

World Championships
World Karate Championships
World Karate Championships
Karate Championships
Karate competitions in Malaysia
December 1994 sports events in Asia
Kota Kinabalu